The NEO-China Top City Main Tower is a 795 ft (242 m) tall skyscraper in the Jiulongpo District within the city of Chongqing, China.

The tower has 54 floors and is the 165th tallest building in the world. It was started in 2005 and completed in 2009.

See also
List of skyscrapers
List of tallest buildings in Chongqing

References

2009 establishments in China
Office buildings completed in 2009
Skyscraper office buildings in Chongqing
Skyscraper hotels in Chongqing
Retail buildings in China
Skyscrapers in Chongqing